Roseneath may refer to:

Roseneath, an historical misspelling of name of the village of Rosneath, Argyll and Bute, Scotland and from which a number of other place-names derive

Places

Africa
 Roseneath, KwaZulu-Natal, South Africa

Australia 

Roseneath, Queensland, in Australia

Canada 
Roseneath, Ontario, in Canada

New Zealand 
Roseneath, Wellington, a suburb of Wellington, New Zealand
Roseneath, Otago, a suburb of Dunedin, New Zealand

United States 
Roseneath (Gloster, Louisiana), listed on the NRHP in Louisiana

Other
The Roseneath Terrier, a former name of the West Highland White Terrier
Roseneath Theatre, a not-for-profit Theatre for Young Audiences (TYA) company which is officed in downtown Toronto but tours its productions to schools grades JK-12 across the province of Ontario